Temple Bruer with Temple High Grange is a civil parish and a former extra-parochial area in North Kesteven, Lincolnshire, which had in the Medieval period been held by the Knights Templar and later by the Knights Hospitaller of Temple Bruer Preceptory. By an Act of Parliament passed on 5 March 1879, Temple Bruer with Temple High Grange was constituted as a parish. At that time the parish was in Flaxwell wapentake, Sleaford Union and County Court district, and the ecclesiastical rural deanery of Longobody. Wellingore and Welbourn parishes lie to the west and Brauncewell to the south. The old Roman road, Ermine Street, passes through the western edge of the parish, which at this point is a bridleway not a modern road. Temple High Grange is part of the parish. The parish is now within the electoral area of Ashby de la Launde and Cranwell Ward in North Kesteven District Council.

Temple Bruer Church

St John's Church, Temple Bruer was built to designs by James Fowler of Louth in 1874.

Village School
This was built in 1873 with accommodation for 45 children.

References

External links

Civil parishes in Lincolnshire
North Kesteven District